Erythravine is a tetrahydroisoquinoline alkaloid found in the plant Erythrina mulungu and other species of the genus Erythrina.

Biological activity 
Some laboratory research has investigated the biological activity of erythravine, but the relevance to effects in humans is unknown.

Nicotinic acetylcholine receptor 

It has been shown to be a potent nicotinic receptor antagonist in animal models with an IC50 of 6µM at the α7 site and 13 nM for the α4β2 receptor.

Anxiolytic 
It appears to have anxiolytic effects in animal models of anxiety. Further studies suggest that the anxiolytic effects are only reproducible with the whole extract of Erythrina Mulungu but not with the pure alkaloids.

Anticonvulsant 
Erythravine inhibited seizures evoked by bicuculline, pentylenetetrazole, and kainic acid as well as increasing the latency of seizures induced by NMDA. Treatment with erythravine prevented death in all the animals tested with the four convulsants except a few of those treated with kainic acid.

See also
 Bark isolates

References

Norsalsolinol ethers
Cyclohexenols
Anticonvulsants
Nicotinic antagonists
Anxiolytics
Isoquinoline alkaloids
Conjugated dienes